Giovanni Bordiga (2 April 1854 in Novara – 16 June 1933 in Venice) was an Italian mathematician who worked on algebraic and projective geometry at the university of Padua.
He introduced the Bordiga surface.

Giovanni as the son of Carlo and Amalia Adami. He matriculated at a young age to Turin University, graduating in 1874 in civil engineering.

From 22 December 1929 until his death, he was president of the Ateneo Veneto of Science, Letters and Arts.

He was the paternal uncle of Italian Left Communist theorist Amadeo Bordiga.

References

19th-century Italian mathematicians
1854 births
1933 deaths
20th-century Italian mathematicians
University of Padua alumni
University of Turin alumni
Italian civil engineers
19th-century Italian engineers